Leo Harold Hays (born September 24, 1939) is a former American football linebacker in the National Football League (NFL) for the Dallas Cowboys and San Francisco 49ers. He played college football at University of Southern Mississippi.

Early years
Hays attended Hattiesburg High School, where he played as a defensive tackle and center. After graduation he went into military service for one year. 

He returned to play college football for Southern Mississippi University in 1960. He played center and linebacker and became a two-year starter.

In 1977, he was inducted into the Southern Mississippi Hall of Fame.

Professional career

Dallas Cowboys
Hays was selected by the Dallas Cowboys in the fourteenth round (186th overall) of the 1962 NFL Draft with a future draft pick, which allowed the team to draft him before his college eligibility was over. He also was selected by the Houston Oilers in the 26th round (207th overall) of the 1962 AFL Draft. 

On December 1, 1962, he signed with the Cowboys. He spent 5 seasons as a reserve linebacker, behind one of the greatest linebacking corps (Chuck Howley, Lee Roy Jordan and Dave Edwards) in NFL history. On June 24, 1968, he was traded to the San Francisco 49ers in exchange for a third round draft choice (#68-Tom Stincic).

San Francisco 49ers
Hays played two seasons with the San Francisco 49ers as a reserve linebacker. He was released on September 15, 1970.

Personal life
Hays won the Texas National Bass Tournament in 1969.

References

1939 births
Living people
American football linebackers
Dallas Cowboys players
San Francisco 49ers players
Southern Miss Golden Eagles football players
Sportspeople from Hattiesburg, Mississippi
Players of American football from Mississippi